The Australia Singapore Cable (ASC) is a 4,600 km fibre-optic submarine communications cable that entered service in September 2018, linking Australia and Singapore via Christmas Island and Indonesia. ASC is owned and operated by Vocus Communications and interconnects with the Vocus Australian domestic optical fibre network at the Australian landing site in Perth. The ASC consists of four fibre pairs and, at launch, had a total design capacity of 40 terabits per second.

In 2019 the cable was upgraded to a total design capacity of 60 terabits per second.

In 2021, the cable was damaged after a ship that is operated by Maersk caught a portion of the cable with its anchor, disrupting Perth operations. The captain of the ship has been detained by the Australian Federal Police. Normal operations have also resumed after repairs were made.

Landing points
Perth, Western Australia
Flying Fish Cove, Christmas Island
Anyer, Indonesia
Tanah Merah, Singapore

See also
 Other Australian international submarine cables (and year of first service):
 INDIGO-West (2019)
 Hawaiki Cable (2018)
 Pipe Pacific Cable (2009)
 Telstra Endeavour (2008)
 Australia–Japan Cable (2001)
 Southern Cross Cable (2000)
 SEA-ME-WE 3 (2000, Australian portion in service earlier)
 JASURAUS (1997)
 PacRimWest (1995)

References

Submarine communications cables in the Indian Ocean
Australia–Singapore relations
2018 establishments in Australia
2018 establishments in Indonesia
2018 establishments in Singapore